Kishor Shantabai Kale (1970–2007) was a Marathi writer and social worker from Maharashtra, India. He was the son of a Kolhati tamasha artist. He studied at the Grant Medical College to become a medical doctor. Kale died at age 37 in a car accident on February 21, 2007. He was closely related to Madhu Kambikar an Indian film artist.

Works

Kolhatyacha Por 
In 1994, he wrote his autobiography Kolhatyacha Por (son of a kolhati)  (कोल्ह्याट्याचा पोर) in Marathi. It has been translated to English by Sandhya Pandey and titled Against all odds. There has been a demand from the Kolhati community that the book be banned as they consider it libellous.

Hijara Ek Mard 
His novel, Hijara Ek Mard [Eunuch, A Man], was also adapted for the stage. Kale acted in the lead role of a eunuch in this play, Andharyatra.

References

2007 deaths
Marathi-language writers
1970 births